Dyspessa stroehlei is a moth in the family Cossidae. It was described by Yakovlev in 2008. It is found in north-eastern Turkey.

The length of the forewings is about 14 mm. The forewings are light-grey with a brownish pattern of strokes. The hindwings are light-grey.

References

Natural History Museum Lepidoptera generic names catalog

Moths described in 2008
Dyspessa
Moths of Asia